Pekka Ristola (born 13 May 1929) was a Finnish nordic combined skier who competed in the 1960s. He finished fourth in the Nordic combined event at the 1960 Winter Olympics in Squaw Valley. Ristola was born in Iitti.

External links

 Pekka Ristola's profile at Sports Reference.com
 

1929 births
Possibly living people
People from Iitti
Finnish male Nordic combined skiers
Nordic combined skiers at the 1960 Winter Olympics
Sportspeople from Kymenlaakso
20th-century Finnish people